Orthoperus scutellaris is a species of minute hooded beetle in the family Corylophidae. It is found in North America.

References

Further reading

 
 

Corylophidae
Articles created by Qbugbot
Beetles described in 1878
Beetles of North America